Balakan may refer to:
 Balakan, Qazvin (بلكان - Balakān)
 Balakan, West Azerbaijan (بالكان - Bālakān)